Huguenin is a surname. Notable people with the surname include:

Gustav Huguenin (1840–1920), Swiss internist and pathologist
Marianne Huguenin (born 1950), Swiss politician
Marcel Huguenin (1930–2020), Swiss cross-country skier
René Huguenin (born 1944), Swiss ice hockey player
Victor Huguenin (1802–1860), French sculptor